Defiance is a 1997 video game for Microsoft Windows, developed by American studio Logicware and published by Visceral Productions of Avalon Hill. The game is a first-person shooter, with a sci-fi/futuristic setting.

Gameplay 
Defiance is a first-person shooter with primitive 3D graphics, playing very similarly to Doom (1993). The graphics of Defiance use the 2.5D style, a way to make 2D graphics look 3D. It also includes a dynamic aim feature, where the camera bobs based on movement input. Defiance uses technology called Ncircle to make more realistic three-dimensional sound. The game boast MMX and 3D-accelerated support but it only makes realistic explosions. Defiance manages to successfully imitate its insipid color palette with plenty of brown and gray. The player controls an elite unnamed fighter pilot who rides the LAV-6 SABER, a weaponized mech, as they traverse through Calchona, a military complex. The first level of Defiance acts as a tutorial stage, introducing several of the game's core mechanics, such as the thruster, and setting up the plot. From that point on, the levels, which there are 13 of, play much like Descent (1995).  In game, there are a plethora of enemies to fight. The player must also manage lift fuel, shields, hull durability, and weapons. Enemies often swarm the player through the complex, labyrinth like level setup of the game.

Setting 
The action takes place on the planet Calchona, in a military complex. There is a war raging between Hegemonistic Core of Planets and the Anterran Premacy Worlds, but it is being waged in space so no civilians are killed and no planets rendered uninhabitable. Unfortunately, both sides have reached a stalemate, forcing the player and the rest of the "good guys" to resort to planetary warfare.

Reception 
Defiance received reviews from publications including GameSpot, GameStar, Adrenaline Vault, PC Player, and Computer Games Magazine.

A 1998 review from GameSpot stated that "Although this is not a terrible game, there's nothing here that would merit someone to really consider buying it when there are so many other 3D games of such a higher caliber."

References 

1997 video games
First-person shooters
Science fiction video games
Video games developed in the United States
Windows games
Windows-only games
Single-player video games